Chestnut Mountain is an unincorporated community in Hall County, Georgia, United States.

The community was named after J. T. Chestnut, a pioneer citizen.

References

Unincorporated communities in Hall County, Georgia
Unincorporated communities in Georgia (U.S. state)